Féile ("Festival") was a music festival held in the Republic of Ireland between 1990 and 1997, originally known as The Trip to Tipp.  The original venue was in Semple Stadium in Thurles, County Tipperary, hence the nicknames of "The Trip to Tipp". In 1995, it was held in Páirc Uí Chaoimh in Cork city; Féile 96 was indoors at the Point Depot in Dublin.  Féile was generally a three-day festival held over the bank holiday weekend in early August. In 1996 it was in July; in 1997, it was reduced to a single day in late August.

The festival was a progression from the Siamsa Cois Laoi held in Páirc Uí Chaoimh in the 1980s, and the Slane Concerts at Slane Castle, which had been on hiatus since 1987 but would return from 1992.  The Oxegen festival, first held as Witnness at Fairyhouse Racecourse in 2000, was seen as filling the gap left by the ending of Féile, and had the same promoters, MCD. In September 2018 the event took place again, and was known as Féile Classical. A 2-day event at Semple Stadium, was also announced to take place on 20–21 September 2019, and proposed to feature Sinead O'Connor, Sultans of Ping, Therapy? and other Irish acts of the 1990s, under the names "Féile 19" and "Tripp to Tipp Weekender".

1990
Meat Loaf & Big Country topped the bill on the Friday night. Hothouse Flowers headlined the Saturday night line-up, although there were acts onstage from midday. The Sunday line-up included Van Morrison. Other acts to perform included Deacon Blue, The 4 Of Us, Mary Black, Big Country, No Sweat, Little Angels, Thee Amazing Colossal Men, Maria McKee, That Petrol Emotion, Something Happens, Energy Orchard, The Saw Doctors, and Moving Hearts

Main stage

1991
Acts included Van Morrison, Nanci Griffith, Elvis Costello, The Pogues, Steve Earle, The Las, The Golden Horde, Ride, Happy Mondays, Luka Bloom, Transvision Vamp, The Farm, Something Happens, Marc Cohn, The Mock Turtles, Candy Dulfer, Black Francis, The Stunning, The Fat Lady Sings, The La's, and Paul Brady. The Saw Doctors played again, with Mike Scott of The Waterboys joining them to sing "The Trip to Tipp", which they had co-written for the occasion.

Main stage

1992
Acts included Bryan Adams, Simply Red, Christy Moore, David Byrne, Kirsty MacColl, The Wonder Stuff, the Saw Doctors, The Stunning, The Beautiful South, Inspiral Carpets, Primal Scream, PJ Harvey, Ned's Atomic Dustbin, James, Toasted Heretic, and Extreme.

Main stage

1993
Acts included INXS, Iggy Pop, The Levellers, The Sultans of Ping FC, The Christians, The Shamen, Kerbdog, A House, The Frank and Walters , Chris de Burgh and a last-minute special-guest addition of The Golden Horde. Unruly behaviour by fans attracted criticism, with 141 arrests, mostly for drug possession, and two rapes reported. The concert reportedly generated IR£300,000 for the Gaelic Athletic Association. There were three stages, and the Jim Rose Circus.

Main stage

Hot Press Stage

1994
1994 was Féile's final year as an on-grounds camping festival and tagged 'The Last Trip To Tipp'. Acts included The Prodigy, Blur, The Cranberries, Björk, Rage Against the Machine, House of Pain, Kerbdog, Cypress Hill, Grant Lee Buffalo and Aimee Mann amongst others. This was the last year of the initial arrangement with the GAA for the use of Semple Stadium. Objections from locals prevented renewing the arrangement. Televised by MTV, many of the artists stated their praise for the crowd as one of the most electric audiences they'd ever had. Dance music dominated over rock in the lineups.

Main stage

1995
The Féile name was retained but the concert moved to Páirc Uí Chaoimh in Cork city for 4, 5 and 6 August.	
The campsite was further from the venue, diminishing the festival atmosphere. Acts included The Prodigy whose performance was disrupted twice by power cuts, The Stone Roses, Orbital, Paul Weller, Elastica, Ash, Black Grape, Dodgy, Blur, Sleeper, The Boo Radleys, The Beautiful South, Tricky, Lush, Moby and The Devlins. Kylie Minogue appeared in the sidebar at an early stage in her transition from teenybopper to dance queen. Free condoms were distributed to concertgoers.

A man, Bernard Rice, was drowned trying to swim across the River Lee to the stadium.  The city coroner, Cornelius Riordan, condemned Féile at the inquest, allegedly describing it as "an extravaganza of song, music and sleazy excesses that seem to have cast a hypnotic spell over the youth, as testified by this tragedy". Promoter MCD, and its head Denis Desmond, sued Riordan for slander; the case was settled out of court.

1996
Pulp had been scheduled to play a concert at the Point Depot, the largest indoor music venue in Dublin, accommodating 4,500 fans.  With no outdoor venue secured for a festival-style Féile, the Point event was expanded into a multi-act weekend, with Pulp headling on the Saturday. Acts on Friday were Joyrider, The Jesus Lizard, The Afghan Whigs, Beck, Manic Street Preachers, and Foo Fighters. Acts on the Sunday included Alanis Morissette, Frank Black, Mundy and Mazzy Star.

1997
The festival returned to Thurles in 1997, reduced to a single day to allay local concerns about unruly campers. It was billed / rebranded as the "Day Trip to Tipp". Acts included The Cardigans, Reef, Foo Fighters, Kula Shaker, Manic Street Preachers, and The Prodigy . No alcohol was on sale in the stadium.

Féile Classical (2018)
A fully seated "Féile Classical" event took place in Semple Stadium during September 2018, hosted by Tom Dunne and featuring the Irish Chamber Orchestra with reappearances by The Stunning, the Hothouse Flowers, An Emotional Fish, Something Happens, The 4 of Us, and the Frank and Walters. A similar event was announced for 2019.

Féile 19 (2019)
A return to the classic Feile set up with all the bands playing full sets and featuring Sinead O'Connor, Therapy?, Sultans of Ping, The Stunning, EMF, Wendy James and more was held.

References

Sources
 
 Cork Rock: From Rory Gallagher to the Sultans of Ping, by Mark McAvoy. Published by Mercier Press (2009) .

Citations

1990s in Irish music
1990 establishments in Ireland
Recurring events disestablished in 1997
Rock festivals in Ireland
Thurles
Tourist attractions in County Cork
Music festivals established in 1990
1997 disestablishments in Ireland